The 2011–12 FC Augsburg season was the 105th season in the football club's history and the club's inaugural season in the Bundesliga. The season started on 30 July against Rot-Weiß Oberhausen in the DFB-Pokal. Promotion to the 2011–12 Bundesliga was the culmination of a decade-long process started by clothing magnate Walther Seinisch.

Review and events
2011–12 season was the club's debut season in the Bundesliga.

Competitions

Bundesliga

League table

Matches

DFB-Pokal

Player information

Roster and statistics

Transfers

In

Out

Sources

Augsburg
FC Augsburg seasons